The 2022 Wandsworth London Borough Council elections took place on 5 May 2022.

All 58 members of Wandsworth London Borough Council were elected. The elections took place alongside local elections in the other London boroughs and elections to local authorities across the United Kingdom.

In the previous election in 2018, the Conservative Party maintained their longstanding control of the council, winning 33 out of the 60 seats with the Labour Party forming the principal opposition with 26 of the remaining 27 seats. The 2022 election took place under new election boundaries, which reduced the number of councillors to 58. Labour won control for the first time since 1978.

Background

History 

The thirty-two London boroughs were established in 1965 by the London Government Act 1963. They are the principal authorities in Greater London and have responsibilities including education, housing, planning, highways, social services, libraries, recreation, waste, environmental health and revenue collection. Some of the powers are shared with the Greater London Authority, which also manages passenger transport, police, and fire.

Wandsworth was alternately under Labour and Conservative control in the elections after its creation, and subsequently has been under Conservative control since the 1978 election. In the most recent election in 2018, the council was considered a key target for Labour in London. The Conservatives held the council, winning 33 seats with 38.3% of the vote, while Labour won 26 seats with 38.7% of the vote. The independent candidate Malcolm Grimston was also elected.

Council term 

Candida Jones, a Labour councillor for Furzedown, resigned in 2019 due to taking a politically restricted job. Graham Loveland held the seat for Labour in the subsequent by-election, with the Liberal Democrats increasing their share of the vote to come in second place. A Labour councillor for Bedford ward, Fleur Anderson, resigned in April 2021 having been elected as MP for Putney in the 2019 general election. A by-election to fill the seat was held on 6 May 2021 alongside the 2021 London mayoral election and London Assembly election, which was won by the Labour candidate Hannah Stanislaus. In August 2021, Stanislaus resigned from the Labour Party to sit as independent, saying that they had "been bullied out" and that the party whip had made a personal attack against them in a report. They later resigned as a councillor, with a by-election held on 25 November. The Labour candidate Sheila Boswell held it for the party with a majority of a single vote over the Conservative candidate.

Along with most London boroughs, Wandsworth was electing councillors under new ward boundaries in 2022. Following local consultation, the Local Government Boundary Commission for England produced new boundaries reducing the number of councillors from 60 to 58 across fourteen three-councillor wards and eight two-seat wards.

Campaign 
The Conservative peer Robert Hayward said that his party was "almost certain" to lose control of the borough in the wake of the partygate scandal. At the 2019 general election, all the constituencies that cover the borough were represented by Labour MPs. Nick Bowes, the chief executive of the Centre for London, highlighted that the mayor of London Sadiq Khan had won a majority of wards in the borough in the 2021 London mayoral election.

Extinction Rebellion campaigners disrupted the launch of the Conservative campaign at a luxury car dealership. The Labour Party promised to build a thousand "new council homes on council land" if they won. The Labour councillor Peter Carpenter was suspended and blocked from standing for re-election by his party in March 2022 for posting on Twitter that the Conservative chancellor of the Exchequer Rishi Sunak should "go back to India".

Electoral process 
Wandsworth, as with all other London borough councils, elects all of its councillors at once every four years, with the previous election having taken place in 2018. The election took place by multi-member first-past-the-post voting, with each ward being represented by two or three councillors. Electors had as many votes as there were councillors to be elected in their ward, with the top two or three being elected.

All registered electors (British, Irish, Commonwealth and European Union citizens) living in London aged 18 or over were entitled to vote in the election. People who lived at two addresses in different councils, such as university students with different term-time and holiday addresses, were entitled to be registered for and vote in elections in both local authorities. Voting in-person at polling stations took place from 7:00 to 22:00 on election day, and voters were able to apply for postal votes or proxy votes in advance of the election.

Council composition

Results summary

Ward results

Balham

Battersea Park

East Putney

Falconbrook

Furzedown

Lavender

Nine Elms

Northcote

Roehampton

Shaftesbury & Queenstown

South Balham

Southfields

St Mary's

Thamesfield

Tooting Bec

Tooting Broadway

Trinity

Wandle

Wandsworth Common

Wandsworth Town

West Hill

West Putney

References 

Council elections in the London Borough of Wandsworth
Wandsworth